The Gioia 22 Tower is an office skyscraper in Milan, Italy.

History 
The project for the tower, designed by Gregg Jones from Pelli Clarke Pelli was presented on November 16, 2017. Construction works began in 2018 with the demolition of a 1960s building that had remained abandoned since 2012.

Description 

Gallery

References

External links

Skyscrapers in Milan
Skyscraper office buildings in Italy